Lee Guk-joo (李國主, born on January 5, 1986), is a South Korean comedienne under FNC Entertainment.

Early life and career
Lee made her debut by joining MBC as a 15th generation comedian. She initially signed with CoKo Entertainment, but due to their bankruptcy, she later signed with FNC Entertainment.

Filmography

Television series

Variety shows

Radio show

Music video appearances

Awards and nominations

References

External links 
 
 

1982 births
Living people
South Korean women comedians
South Korean radio presenters
South Korean television presenters
South Korean women television presenters
FNC Entertainment artists
South Korean women radio presenters
Best Variety Performer Female Paeksang Arts Award (television) winners